Salisbury is a town in Merrimack County, New Hampshire, United States. The population was 1,422 at the 2020 census.

History
While still part of Massachusetts, the town was granted as "Baker's Town" after Captain Thomas Baker in 1736. After the border between Massachusetts and New Hampshire was fixed, the town was on the New Hampshire side of the border. It was re-granted by the Masonian proprietors in 1749 with the name "Stevenstown", after Colonel Ebenezer Stevens of Kingston, New Hampshire, and settled as early as 1750. Additionally known as "Gerrishtown" and "New Salisbury", the name "Salisbury" was taken when the town incorporated in 1768.

Geography

The Blackwater River, a south-flowing tributary of the Contoocook River and part of the Merrimack River watershed, runs through the west side of the town. A popular fishing and recreation spot is The Bay, a natural lake-like section of the river. The east side of the town is drained by streams that run directly to the Merrimack River.

Adjacent municipalities 
 Andover (north)
 Franklin (northeast)
 Boscawen (southeast)
 Webster (south)
 Warner (southwest)

Demographics

At the 2000 census there were 1,137 people, 435 households, and 324 families in the town. The population density was 28.5 people per square mile (11.0/km). There were 514 housing units at an average density of 12.9 per square mile (5.0/km). The racial makeup of the town was 97.80% White, 0.70% African American, 0.26% Asian, 0.09% Pacific Islander, 0.18% from other races, and 0.97% from two or more races. Hispanic or Latino of any race were 0.70%.

Of the 435 households 31.7% had children under the age of 18 living with them, 69.0% were married couples living together, 4.1% had a female householder with no husband present, and 25.3% were non-families. 17.0% of households were one person and 6.2% were one person aged 65 or older. The average household size was 2.61 and the average family size was 3.00.

The age distribution was 24.5% under the age of 18, 6.1% from 18 to 24, 28.2% from 25 to 44, 31.1% from 45 to 64, and 10.0% 65 or older. The median age was 40 years. For every 100 females, there were 103.4 males. For every 100 females age 18 and over, there were 96.3 males.

The median household income was $55,000 and the median family income  was $62,321. Males had a median income of $36,991 versus $28,462 for females. The per capita income for the town was $23,112.  About 0.6% of families and 1.9% of the population were below the poverty threshold, including 0.7% of those under age 18 and 4.6% of those age 65 or over.

Notable people 

 Ichabod Bartlett (1786–1853), US congressman
 Samuel E. Pingree (1832–1922), Union Army officer, Medal of Honor recipient, 40th governor of Vermont
 Ezekiel A. Straw (1819–1882), engineer, businessman, 34th governor of New Hampshire
 Daniel Webster (1782–1852), US congressman, senator from Massachusetts; 14th and 19th US Secretary of State; born in 1782 in what was then part of Salisbury, now within the city limits of Franklin

References

External links
 
 Salisbury Free Library
 New Hampshire Economic and Labor Market Information Bureau Profile

 
Towns in Merrimack County, New Hampshire
Towns in New Hampshire